"Don't Know What to Tell Ya" is a song recorded by American singer Aaliyah. It was written by Static Major and Timbaland for her eponymous third studio album (2001), and was produced by the latter. However, it did not make the final cut for Aaliyah and remained unreleased until after Aaliyah's August 25, 2001 death. The song was then included on the posthumous compilation album I Care 4 U (2002) and was released as its second single on February 11, 2003 by Blackground Records and Universal Records.

Upon its release, "Don't Know What to Tell Ya" received widespread critical acclaim. Due to a limited release, it only peaked at number 70 on the US Hot R&B/Hip-Hop Singles Sales. It fared better internationally, peaking at number 22 in the United Kingdom and within the top 40 in Australia and Switzerland.

Music and lyrics
"Don't Know What to Tell Ya" was described as having a "noir-funk feel that evokes Blade Runner". The song is sampled from the Egyptian Arabic song "Batwanes Beek" by Warda, and its composer Salah El Sharnouby had not been credited for his work. Lyrically on the song, Aaliyah discusses a failing relationship.

Release
"Don't Know What to Tell Ya" was released as the second international single from I Care 4 U on February 11, 2003, by Blackground Records and Universal Records. In the United States, it was released as the fourth and final single from the album, as a double A-side single with the remix of "Got to Give It Up", on September 9.

In August 2021, it was reported that Aaliyah's recorded work for Blackground (since rebranded as Blackground Records 2.0) would be re-released on physical, digital, and, for the first time ever, streaming services in a deal between the label and Empire Distribution. I Care 4 U and Ultimate Aaliyah, both including "Don't Know What to Tell Ya", were re-released on October 8.

Critical reception
Bianca Gracie from Fuse felt that the song's "Middle Eastern" inspired production made it more "dramatic". Arion Berger from Rolling Stone praised Aaliyah's vocals on "Don't Know What to Tell Ya", saying: "Her sweet, strong voice whips around the ambivalence" on the song. Sal Cinquemani from Slant Magazine called the song a "cool midtempo number" and described it as "Aaliyah-lite".

Track listings and formats

US 12-inch vinyl
 "Don't Know What to Tell Ya" (album version) – 5:02
 "Got to Give It Up" (remix) – 3:58

UK CD single
 "Don't Know What to Tell Ya" (edited version) – 3:03
 "Don't Know What to Tell Ya" (Handcuff Remix) – 5:18
 "Miss You" (music video) – 4:17

UK 12-inch vinyl
 "Don't Know What to Tell Ya" (album version) – 5:02
 "Try Again" – 4:44
 "Don't Know What to Tell Ya" (Handcuff Remix) – 5:18

European CD single
 "Don't Know What to Tell Ya" (radio edit) – 3:35
 "Don't Know What to Tell Ya" (Thomas Eriksen Mix) – 5:18

European and Australian maxi CD single
 "Don't Know What to Tell Ya" (radio edit) – 3:35
 "Don't Know What to Tell Ya" (Thomas Eriksen Mix) – 5:18
 "Don't Know What to Tell Ya" (Intenso Project Remix) – 6:58
 "Don't Know What to Tell Ya" (album version) – 5:02

French CD single
 "Don't Know What to Tell Ya" (album version) – 5:02
 "Try Again" – 4:44

Belgian, Dutch and Luxembourgish CD single
 "Don't Know What to Tell Ya" (radio edit) – 3:35
 "Don't Know What to Tell Ya" (Intenso Project Remix) – 6:58

Belgian, Dutch and Luxembourgish maxi CD single
 "Don't Know What to Tell Ya" (Thomas Eriksen Mix) – 5:18
 "Don't Know What to Tell Ya" (Intenso Project Remix) – 6:58
 "Don't Know What to Tell Ya" (radio edit) – 3:35

Credits and personnel
Credits are adapted from the liner notes of I Care 4 U.
 Aaliyah – vocals
 Jimmy Douglass – mixing, recording
 Salah El Sharnobi – writing
 Static Major – writing
 Timbaland – mixing, production, writing

Charts

Release history

Notes

References

External links
 
 Official website

2002 songs
2003 singles
Aaliyah songs
Funk songs
Song recordings produced by Timbaland
Songs written by Timbaland
Songs written by Static Major